SS Ideal X, a converted World War II T-2 oil tanker, was the first commercially successful container ship.

Built by The Marinship Corporation during World War II as Potrero Hills, she was later purchased by Malcom McLean's Pan-Atlantic Steamship Company. In 1955, the ship was modified to carry shipping containers and rechristened Ideal X. During her first voyage in her new configuration, on April 26, 1956, the Ideal X carried 58 containers from Port Newark, New Jersey, to Port of Houston, Texas, where 58 trucks were waiting to be loaded with the containers. It was not the first purpose built container ship: the Clifford J. Rodgers, operated by the White Pass and Yukon Route, had made its debut in 1955.

In 1959, the vessel was acquired by Bulgarian owners, who rechristened her Elemir. The Elemir suffered extensive damage during heavy weather on February 8, 1964, and was sold in turn to Japanese breakers. She was finally scrapped on October 20, 1964, in Hirao, Japan.

Notes

References

External links
Vessel data at Dept. of Transportation (Link Broken)
April 26, 1956: The Container Ship's Maiden Voyage

Container ships
T2 tankers
1944 ships
Ships built in Sausalito, California
World War II merchant ships of the United States
Steamships of the United States
Merchant ships of the United States
Merchant ships of Bulgaria
Steamships of Bulgaria